The A658 is a road in Yorkshire, UK.

Route
It runs from Bradford, West Yorkshire  to Knaresborough, North Yorkshire  passing along the way Leeds Bradford International Airport, where it runs through a tunnel directly under the main runway. The road starts near to the cathedral in Bradford, crossing the A650 almost immediately as it heads north westwards from the city. The A658 originally terminated south of the village of Pannal at the junction with the A61, but was extended when the south Harrogate and Knaresborough bypass was built and the road now ends east of Knaresborough where it meets the A59.

Places along the A658 
Bradford
Eccleshill
Greengates
Apperley Bridge
Leeds
Yeadon
Leeds Bradford International Airport
Pool in Wharfedale
Huby
Harrogate Spa
Knaresborough

References

External links

A658 on SABRE

Roads in Yorkshire
Transport in North Yorkshire
Transport in West Yorkshire